Nebria xanthacra is a species of ground beetle in the Nebriinae subfamily that can be found in Iran, Turkmenistan, and Himachal Pradesh province of India.

References

xanthacra
Beetles described in 1850
Beetles of Asia